Destination: Deep Space, stylized as DESTINATION: DEEP SPACE and officially known as Destination: Deep Space Presented By The Boeing Company, is the FIRST Robotics Competition game for the 2019 season. It involves two alliances of three teams each, with each team controlling a robot and performing specific tasks on a field to score points. The game centers around an outer space theme involving two alliances consisting of three teams each competing to place poly-carbonate hatch panels and orange rubber balls or "cargo" on rockets and cargo ships before returning to their HAB platform to climb at the end of the match.

Kickoff 
The kickoff event occurred on January 5, 2019. The kickoff video was styled after a rocket launch, with information about FIRST and the game reveal itself linked to specific points in the countdown. The event was livestreamed starting at 10:30 AM Eastern Time, with many teams attending their own local kickoff events.

Field 
Destination: Deep Space is played on a 27 ft (823 cm) by 54 ft (1646 cm) field that is covered in grey carpet. The field is bounded by transparent polycarbonate guardrails on the longer sides and the Alliance Station walls on the shorter side. The field features two types of zones, one for each alliance. The hab zone contains robots at the start and end of each match, while the alliance station is where drivers control their robots. For the first time, a Google Cardboard headset was included in the kickoff kit to allow teams to view a virtual field.

Alliance Station
Each alliance has their own Alliance Station that is positioned at one of the ends of the field. The Alliance Station is where drivers control their robots, human players deliver game pieces to robots, and coaches give advice to their team members. Each alliance station features two game piece holding areas on either side of their driver stations.

Depots
Depots are placed on the field next to the alliance stations, with two per alliance. Before the match starts, alliances are permitted to stage cargo in their respective depots for robots to retrieve during the match.

Sandstorm
The sandstorm is installed above each alliance's alliance station, and is used to block the drive team's vision of the field during the sandstorm period. Once that period ends, the sandstorm retracts in order to allow drivers to see the field for the remainder of the match.

Loading Stations
Each alliance station features two loading stations near the edges of the alliance station. Human players use the loading stations to deliver hatch panels and cargo to robots through a chute, where they can be collected by a waiting robot.

Scoring Areas

Rockets
There are four rockets on the field, two per alliance. Each rocket features three levels, made up of two bays, where game pieces can be scored. Two hatch panels and two pieces of cargo can be scored on each level.

Cargo Ships
There are two cargo ships placed in the middle of the field, one per alliance. As with the rockets, each cargo ship features bays where hatch panels and cargo can be scored. Each cargo ship has eight bays, each capable of holding one hatch cover and one cargo.

HAB Platforms
Each alliance controls one hab platform near the alliance station wall. Robots start the match at their alliance's respective hab platform, and must return to the same platform at the end of the match. Each hab platform has three levels, and parking on a higher level at the end of the match earns the alliance more points.

Gameplay and Scoring

Scoring Elements 
There are two scoring elements in Destination: Deep Space; hatch panels and cargo. Hatch panels are 19 in. (~48 cm) diameter polycarbonate toroids, and cargo is represented by orange 13 in. (~33 cm) playground balls.

Before the match begins, teams may discuss and select their robots’ starting formation (i.e., which HAB level they will begin on), as well as which game pieces they will preload into the cargo ship. Each of the six side slots may be loaded with either a cargo ball or a ‘null’ hatch panel

Sandstorm Period 
For the 2019 season, the sandstorm period is the first 15 seconds of the match and replaces the autonomous period, which had been used in many previous FRC games. Robots start the match at their respective HAB platforms, fully supported by HAB platform level one or two. The Sandstorm is a black curtain that begins down to obscure players’ vision of the field. During the period, robots can act solely on pre-programmed instructions, therefore acting autonomously, or under control of their drivers with the optional aid of a vision system mounted on the robot (as they are unable to directly see the field due to the Sandstorm). Robots can earn points in a variety of ways. For each robot that fully crosses the HAB line during the sandstorm period, the alliance earns three points if the robot started on HAB platform level one and six points if the robot started on level two. Robots are also able to earn points for scoring hatch panels and cargo on their alliance's rockets and cargo ship. As these actions carry the same point value as if they occurred in the tele-operated period (or teleop), they will be further discussed in that section. After the 15 second sandstorm period expires, the curtain retracts to grant players vision of the field, and teleop begins.

Electromagnets inside the cargo ship release after this period ends, releasing any cargo not secured by hatch panels. Therefore, there is some risk in selecting to load the cargo ship with cargo balls over null hatch panels - the null hatch panels will immediately hold a cargo ball, for a total value of (0 + 2 =) 2 points, however, a cargo ball secured by a hatch panel before the end of the sandstorm phase is worth a total value of (3 + 2 =) 5 points.

Scoring is further described in the Scoring Summary section.

Tele-operated Period 
After the sandstorm period ends, the tele-op period begins, which lasts for 135 seconds. Drivers control their robot from their Driver Station and human players may  deliver game pieces to the robots. During this period, as in autonomous, every hatch panel scored on a rocket or cargo ship will earn two points for the alliance. Additionally, scoring cargo into a rocket or cargo ship will earn three points for the alliance. Hatch Panels must be scored before cargo (as the cargo will simply roll out), unless there are Hatch Panels installed on the bay.

Endgame 
The last 30 seconds of the teleop period is called the endgame. During this time, robots can earn additional points by climbing back onto their alliance's HAB platform. A robot ending the match on HAB level one will earn the alliance 3 points, while ending the match on level two will earn 6 points and ending the match on level three will earn 12 points.

Special Scoring 
In tournament play, teams are ranked by their Ranking Score, or the average number of Ranking Points they achieve per match. Ranking Points are earned through both winning matches and completing secondary objectives. Therefore, it is more beneficial to focus on accumulating as many ranking points as possible, rather than simply winning every match.

An alliance can earn a ranking point during the qualification rounds by accumulating a total of 15 points at the end of the match through climbing the HAB, known as the HAB docking bonus. An alliance can also earn a ranking point by completing one rocket, which entails scoring two hatch panels and two pieces of cargo on each of its three levels. A foul will result in 3 points being credited to the opposing alliance, and a technical foul will result in 10 points being credited to the opposing alliance.

Scoring Summary

Events 
The competition season for Destination: Deep Space is divided into seven weeks, with many events occurring simultaneously during each week. After Week 7, teams that have qualified compete in the FIRST Championship, held over two weeks in Houston and Detroit. Only regional and district championship events are shown.

Week 1

Week 2

Week 3

Week 4

Week 5

Week 6

Week 7

FIRST Championship

Results 
The following tables show the winners of the subdivisions and finals at each FIRST Championship event.

Houston

Subdivision Winners

Einstein

Round Robin 
<onlyinclude>

Finals

Detroit

Subdivision Winners

Einstein

Round Robin 
<onlyinclude>

Finals

References 

FIRST Robotics Competition games
2019 in robotics